Donk may refer to:

Places
 Donk, a village in the municipality of Berlare, province of East Flanders, Belgium
 Donk, a village in the municipality of Herk-de-Stad, province of Limburg, Belgium
 Donk,  a village in the municipality of Maldegem, province of East Flanders, Belgium
 Donk, Antwerp, a village in the municipality of Mol, a province of Antwerp, Belgium

People with the surname
 Marinus Anton Donk (1908–1972), Dutch mycologist (author abbreviation: Donk)
 Ryan Donk (born 1986), Surinamese footballer

Arts, entertainment, and media

Music
 "Donk" (song), by Soulja Boy Tell 'Em
 Donk, a subgenre of UK Hard House music; also a percussion sound used in this genre
"Put a Donk on it" (song), by Blackout Crew

Other uses in arts, entertainment, and media
 Donk, character in the movie Crocodile Dundee and its sequels
 Donk!, a video game
 Donk, also Donk bet, see Glossary of poker terms

Other uses
 A 1971-76 caprice or impala original or customized.
 Penclawdd RFC in Wales, nicknamed "The Donks"

See also

Donka (disambiguation)
Le Donk & Scor-zay-zee, a 2009 mock documentary film